The 2S1 Gvozdika ("Carnation") is a Soviet self-propelled howitzer introduced in 1972 and in service in Russia and other countries . It is based on the MT-LBu multi-purpose chassis, mounting a 122 mm 2A18 howitzer. "2S1" is its GRAU designation. An alternative Russian designation is SAU-122, but in the Russian Army it is commonly known as Gvozdika. The 2S1 is fully amphibious with very little preparation, and once afloat is propelled by its tracks. A variety of track widths are available to allow the 2S1 to operate in snow or swamp conditions. It is NBC protected and has infrared night-vision capability.

Description 
The 2S1 was developed in Soviet Kharkiv, now in Ukraine. It has seven road wheels on each side; the running gear can be fitted with different widths of track to match terrain. The interior is separated into a driver's compartment on the left, an engine compartment on the right and a fighting compartment to the rear. Within the fighting compartment the commander sits on the left, the loader on the right and the gunner to the front. The all-welded turret is located above the fighting compartment. The 2S1 uses a 122 mm howitzer based on the towed D-30 howitzer. The gun is equipped with a power rammer, a double-baffle muzzle brake and a fume extractor. It is capable of firing HE (high explosive), leaflet, HE/RAP, armor-piercing HE, flechette and chemical rounds.

Production history 
The first prototype was ready in 1958. The 2S1 entered service with the Soviet Army in the early 1970s and was first seen in public at a Polish Army parade in 1974. The vehicle was deployed in large numbers (72 per tank division, 36 per motorized rifle division). It was designated the M1974 by the U.S. Army and manufactured in Soviet, Polish and Bulgarian state factories.

Variants

Former Soviet Union/Russia 

 2S34 Khosta – Modernisation of the 2S1 with the 122 mm 2A31 gun replaced by the 120 mm 2A80-1 gun-mortar. Further improvements include a new Malakhit fire control system, a battlefield observation system and the ability to fire the Kitolov-2M guided ammunition. One unit, the 21st Guards Motor Rifle Brigade in Totskoye, is currently being equipped with the system.
 2S15 Norov – A prototype tank destroyer equipped with a radar-based fire control system and a 100 mm gun.
 2S8 Astra
 UR-77 Meteorit – Mine clearing vehicle with launcher for mine-clearing line charges.

Ukraine 
 Kevlar-E – Infantry fighting vehicle based on the 2S1 platform, equipped with Shturm remote weapon station and room for 6 passengers in addition to the 3 crew. The original 300 horsepower V8 diesel engine has been replaced with a 420 horsepower diesel engine produced by Caterpillar, Cummins or Deutz, increasing the maximum road speed to 70 km/h. The vehicle is amphibious, and has air conditioning, a fire detection and suppression system, an NBC system, navigation system and night-vision equipment. The variant was first introduced in April 2018.

Poland 
The 2S1 Gvozdika, and other related vehicles such as the MT-LB and Opal, were produced in Poland by Huta Stalowa Wola under the name 2S1 Goździk.
 2S1M Goździk – Version with special amphibious kit that increases the vehicle's amphibious capabilities.
 2S1T Goździk – Version with a TOPAZ digital fire control system from WB electronics. The system consists of a FONET-IP digital intercom system, new digital radio, military GPS receiver, military computer and dedicated software. The same system is used on other Polish Armed Forces artillery systems like the AHS Krab, Dana-T and WR-40 Langusta.

Romania 
 OAPR model 89 (Obuzierul autopropulsat românesc, model 89) – Romanian variant combining the 2S1 Gvozdika's turret and a modified version of the MLI-84's chassis. Designed around 1978, produced between 1987 and 1992. Also simply known as Model 89.

Iran 
 Raad-1 ('Thunder') – Iranian variant based on the hull of the Boragh APC.

Serbia 
 2S1 modernized - The modernization is being carried out on the basis of the 122 mm towed howitzer of the Serbian modernization program. Project "SORA 122mm" and NORA B-52. Where the truck platform was abandoned, which was used by the proto-type version of the "SORA 122mm" system In favor of a much better, crawler platform 2S1 Gvozdika system. The action was made possible by two new projectiles and an increased range of about 40% from 15,200 to almost 22,000 m. A new ballistic computer and fire control system make it much faster to prepare for action. There is also a new inertial navigation system,  GPRS, as well as the possibility of action, multiple projectiles in one point MRSI. Thus, it was achieved that with one 2S1 Gvozdika system, in the system of MRSI action in one point, 6 projectiles can be fired in one minute; the modernized 2S1 Gvozdika is much improved. For better defence a turret with a 12.7mm machine gun was added. In 2021, the first modernized 2S1 Gvozdika system battery  was introduced into the Serbian Army.

Myanmar 
 2S1U – In March 2019, a Ukrainian company, the Great Export Import Company, and the Myanmar military have signed a joint-venture agreement to build a plant capable of manufacturing armored personnel carriers (APCs) and self-propelled howitzers. The types of APCs that will be made in the plant are said to be eight-wheeled BTR-4Us while the howitzers will be 2S1Us, which are based on the MT-LBu multipurpose chassis.

Operators

Current operators
  – 145
 
  – 20
  – 81 2S1 and unknown number of UR-77
  – 5
  – 246
  – 506. In 2013, 11 SPG delivered from Poland
  – 10
 
  – 9 (to be used alongside 15 Panzerhaubitze 2000 from German Army stock)
  – 20
 
  – 74 (known as 122 PsH 74). In 2013 three delivered from Poland.
  - 48
 
  – 110 (to be replaced)
 
  – 10
 
 
 
  – 198 To be replaced by SMK Rak and AHS Krab. Some are donated to Ukraine forces during Russian invasion of Ukraine.
  – 622
  – 81 
  – 400
  – unknown number in service as of 2016
  – 638. In June 2018 33 2S1 delivered from Poland and July 2019 16 delivered from Czech Republic.
  – 6 delivered in 1998 from Czech Republic

Former operators 
  – Phased out in the early 2000s.
  – Passed on to successor states.
  – Phased out in 1990 after German reunification.
  – Phased out in 2004. Original there were 144 pieces of Gvozdikas.
  – Phased out. 
 
  – Phased out. 48 reserve status since 2005 (42 OAPR 89s and 6 2S1 Gvozdikas).
  – Phased out.
  – Phased out. 8 reserve status.
  – Passed on to successor states.
  – Passed on to successor states.

Combat history 
 Afghanistan – Soviet–Afghan War
 Chechnya (Russia) –  First Chechen War (1994–1996), Second Chechen War (1999 to 2000)
 Iraq – Iran–Iraq War, Gulf War, Iraq War
 Yugoslavia – Yugoslav Wars
 Georgia – Russo-Georgian War
 Libya – First Libyan Civil War, Second Libyan Civil War
 Syria – Syrian Civil War
 Ukraine – Russo-Ukrainian War

See also 

 PLZ-07
 PLZ-89
 List of artillery
 List of AFVs
 122 mm howitzer 2A18 (D-30)
 2S19 Msta
 2S3 Akatsiya
 2S35 Koalitsiya-SV

References

External links 

 FAS.org
 Armscontrol.ru
 Huta Stalowa Wola – Polish manufacturer
 Arsenal Co. – Bulgarian manufacturer of 2A31(2S1)

122 mm artillery
Self-propelled howitzers of the Soviet Union
Self-propelled artillery of Russia
Self-propelled artillery of Iran
Military vehicles introduced in the 1970s